Pompeo Pozzi (1817–1888)  was an Italian painter, but is best known for his photographs.

Pozzi studied at the Brera Academy of Art, and was a resident of Milan. He mainly painted alpine landscapes and seascapes. 

The painter Luigi Sacchi in 1859 began publishing an art and photography magazine titled L Artista from Pozzi's studio. Many of Pozzi's photographs are now at the Bibliothèque Nationale de France and the École Nationale Supérieure des Beaux-Arts in Paris.

References

1817 births
1890 deaths
19th-century Italian painters
Italian male painters
Italian landscape painters
Italian photographers
Painters from Milan
19th-century Italian male artists